Warren Samuel Fisher (1878–1971) was an American entomologist who specialised in Coleoptera.

He was employed by the National Museum of Natural History in Washington. Fisher was especially interested in Buprestidae and Cerambycidae.

References
Cushman, H. G.,Muesebeck  C. F. W. and Vogt, G. B.. 1972. Warren Samuel Fisher 1878-1971. Proceedings of the Entomological Society of Washington 74(3):344-352.

American entomologists
1878 births
1971 deaths